The All-British was an automobile manufacturer based at Bridgeton, Glasgow, Scotland, from 1906 to 1908.  The company was founded by George Johnston, formerly of Arrol-Johnston, primarily for the manufacture of a 54 horsepower eight-cylinder car with its cylinders arranged as two parallel fours. The pistons were actuated by two rocking beams which were driven by connecting rods from a normal four-throw crankshaft - a variation on the U engine.  The unit was more complex than was necessary, and only a dozen All-British cars were ever completed.

See also
Arrol-Johnston
 List of car manufacturers of the United Kingdom

References

Brass Era vehicles
Defunct motor vehicle manufacturers of Scotland
Manufacturing companies based in Glasgow
1906 establishments in Scotland
1908 disestablishments in Scotland
Vehicle manufacturing companies established in 1906
History of Glasgow
Car manufacturers of the United Kingdom
Vehicle manufacturing companies disestablished in 1908
British companies disestablished in 1908
British companies established in 1906